Harriet the Spy is a 1996 American coming-of-age comedy film directed by Bronwen Hughes in her feature film directorial debut, and starring Michelle Trachtenberg in her major film acting debut. It co-stars Rosie O'Donnell, J. Smith-Cameron, Gregory Smith, and Vanessa Lee Chester. Based on the 1964 novel of the same name by Louise Fitzhugh, the film follows a sixth-grade student who aspires to become a writer and spy.

Filming began in the fall of 1994 in Toronto and was completed by the end of 1995. Produced by Paramount Pictures, Nickelodeon Movies and Rastar, it was the first film produced under the Nickelodeon Movies banner and the first of two film adaptations of the Harriet the Spy books. In theaters, the pilot episode of Hey Arnold! called Arnold was shown before the film.

The film was released in theaters on July 10, 1996. It made $26.6 million worldwide on a production budget of $12 million. The film was released on home video on February 25, 1997, with an orange clamshell packaging.

Plot
Eleven-year-old aspiring spy and writer Harriet M. Welsch lives a privileged life in New York City with her parents, Violetta and Ben, and her nanny, Katherine "Ole Golly", in whom Harriet confides. Harriet and her best friends Simon "Sport" Rocque and Janie Gibbs are enemies with elitist rich girl, editor of the sixth-grade newspaper, and class president Marion Hawthorne.

One night when Harriet's parents are out, Golly invites her friend George to dinner which she burns, so the three go out for dinner and a movie. But when the three return home late in the evening, Violetta becomes enraged at Golly that she had let Harriet stay out past her curfew and she fires her. But Golly concedes that it is time Harriet were on her own. Before leaving, Golly encourages Harriet not to give up on her love of observing people and promises to be the first to buy an autographed copy of Harriet's first novel. Depressed and withdrawn, Harriet breaks into the mansion of Agatha Plummer and is caught hiding in her dumbwaiter.

After school, Marion discovers Harriet's private notebook and begins reading aloud Harriet's comments about her friends, such as how she suspects Janie will grow up to be "a total nutcase", and criticizing Sport's father's low earnings. Sport and Janie turn their backs on Harriet, and her classmates create a Spy-Catcher club to torment her.

When Harriet begins avoiding her homework her parents take away her notebooks and ask her teacher, Miss Elson, to search her for notebooks daily. During art class, Marion and her friends pour blue paint on Harriet as revenge for writing nasty things about them in her notebook. Harriet responds by slapping Marion in the face and flees the school. She exacts revenge by exposing that Marion's father left her family for his secretary, cutting off a chunk of Laura's hair, sabotaging Janie's science experiment, and humiliating Sport with a picture of him in a maid outfit. Her classmates further alienate her.

Harriet's parents send her for evaluation by a psychologist who assures them that Harriet is fine. Harriet gets her notebook back, and in a surprise visit Golly tells her that in order to make things right again, she must do two things which she will not like: apologize and lie. Harriet says it is not worth it but Golly disagrees, saying Harriet is worth it as an individual, and her individuality will make others nervous. She adds: "Good friends are one of life's blessings. Don't give them up without a fight."

Harriet tries to apologize to Sport and Janie, who initially reject her before accepting her apology after being treated unfairly by Marion. Harriet opines to Miss Elson that Marion's appointment as editor was done unfairly, and Miss Elson opens it up for a vote. Harriet is voted in to replace Marion as editor. She writes an article apologizing to the class, all of whom (except Marion) accept her apology. At the opening of the 6th grade pageant, Janie, Sport, and Harriet set off a stink bomb as revenge on Marion, and dance to James Brown's "Get Up Offa That Thing".

Cast
 Michelle Trachtenberg as Harriet M. Welsch
 Rosie O'Donnell as Catherine "Ole Golly" 
 Gregory Smith as Simon "Sport" Rocque
 Vanessa Lee Chester as Janie Gibbs
 J. Smith-Cameron as Violetta Welsch
 Robert Joy as Ben Welsch
 Eartha Kitt as Agatha K. Plummer
 Charlotte Sullivan as Marion Hawthorne
 Teisha Kim as Rachel Hennessy
 Cecilley Carroll as Beth Ellen Hansen
 Dov Tiefenbach as Boy with Purple Socks
 Nina Shock as Carrie Andrews
 Connor Devitt as Pinky Whitehead
 Alisha Morrison as Laura Peters
 Nancy Beatty as Miss Elson
 James Gilfillan as Archie Simmons
 Gerry Quigley as Sport's Dad
 Jackie Richardson as Janie's Mother
 Roger Clown as Dr. Wagner
 Sally Cahill as Maid

Production

Screenplay
The screenplay was adapted from Louise Fitzhugh's 1964 novel of the same name. Director Bronwen Hughes commented on the adaptation: "Certain things about the '60s story, especially the relationship between kids and their parents, had to be adjusted to make sense because you don't have that same kind of formality that you had in the book in the '60s between parents and kids. So those things needed to be made more natural for the 1990s kids audience. But it was very important to me that the things that really affected Harriet in the book would be the things that really affected Harriet in the movie." The result mixed elements from various decades, but Hughes aspired to create a "timeless" film that featured little technology.

Filming
Harriet the Spy was filmed in Toronto during the fall of 1994 and winter of 1995. Director Bronwen Hughes recalled: "It was Paramount's financial decision to make Toronto look like New York, although to tell you the truth, nothing looks like a row of brownstones and stoops like New York, so we just started choosing great locations to create a visual experience."

Michelle Trachtenberg recalled the shoot beginning on October 11, 1994, her ninth birthday. She and co-star Vanessa Lee Chester had known each other prior, having filmed a commercial together in New York City when they were five years old. Charlotte Sullivan recalled of the shoot: "When [Bronwen] would direct us, if we were walking she's like, 'Okay, you'll go bop-bop this way then bop-bop this way', she was always dancing. I don't remember her not dancing on set. And music was always playing. It was very cool and in terms of performance art she was pretty ahead of her time. It was a great way also to direct children. It was a way to keep things alive."

Release

Box office
The film was released in U.S. theaters on July 10, 1996, and the film grossed $6,601,651 on its opening weekend, averaging about $3,615 per each of the 1,826 screens it was shown on. The film went on to gross a total of $26,570,048 by November 10, 1996, and is considered a modest box office success, earning back more than double its $12 million budget.

Home media
Harriet the Spy was released on VHS by Paramount Home Video on February 25, 1997. The cassette also contained two Rugrats music videos, and customers were able to receive $5 rebate if they bought the movie in an orange clamshell case plus two eligible Rugrats videos.

The film was later released on DVD on May 27, 2003.

Reception

Critical response
The film received mixed reviews from critics. On Rotten Tomatoes it has an approval rating of 48% based on reviews from 31 critics. The site's consensus: "Harriet the Spy is a rapid-fire mystery movie that doesn't have much to offer beyond the two decent lead performances." Audiences surveyed by CinemaScore gave it a grade B+.

Rita Kempley of The Washington Post was critical of the film, deeming it a "tedious" adaptation of the source novel, adding: "Harriet the Spy isn't really a story, but a dark slice of this ruminative child's inner life. Like the more clearly comic Welcome to the Dollhouse, this film finds more wrong than wonder in these terrible, tenderfoot years." Roger Ebert praised the performance of Trachtenberg, but conceded: "It is not a very technically accomplished movie--the pacing is slow and there are scenes that seem amateurish--but since Harriet doesn't intend to inspire anyone to become a movie critic, perhaps it will work a certain charm for its target audience." Owen Gleiberman of Entertainment Weekly, a self-proclaimed fan of the novel, wrote that the film "has its sticky, Afterschool Special side (the ending is way too pat), but at its best it’s like a Welcome to the Dollhouse for preadolescents. What Fitzhugh’s book had, and what the movie gets, is the glee and neurotic terror of a kid lurching into adult consciousness, learning just how dangerous that notebook we all carry around in our heads really is."

John Anderson of the Los Angeles Times also commented on the film's darker elements, writing that it is "fun, yes, but [it] isn't afraid to expose the nastiness of youth or the offhanded cruelty of one girl's ego. This is not a happy little movie about the sweetness of childhood." Barbara Shulgasser of The San Francisco Examiner dismissed the film, describing the protagonist as "the kind of kid I'm not looking forward to meeting as a grownup...  While the well-loved novel was apparently about the admirable battle a kid must wage in order to become an artist in the face of peer disapproval, the movie seems to be about a mean-spirited tyke who has no scruples. If that kind of person wants to become an artist, it's OK by me, but I don't have to root for her."

Accolades

Remake
Another adaptation of Harriet the Spy was released as a television movie in 2010 entitled Harriet the Spy: Blog Wars, with Jennifer Stone in the title role.

References

External links

 
 
 
 

1996 films
1996 comedy-drama films
1996 directorial debut films
1990s coming-of-age comedy-drama films
1990s mystery comedy-drama films
1990s spy comedy films
American children's comedy films
American coming-of-age comedy-drama films
American mystery comedy-drama films
American spy comedy films
Children's comedy-drama films
Films about bullying
Films about nannies
Films based on American novels
Films based on children's books
Films directed by Bronwen Hughes
Films scored by Jamshied Sharifi
Films set in 1996
Films set in New York City
Films shot in Florida
Films shot in Toronto
Nickelodeon Movies films
Paramount Pictures films
1990s English-language films
1990s American films